Nikola Djurasović (born August 8, 1983) is a Bosnian professional basketball player for Leotar of the Bosnia and Herzegovina Championship.

Djurasović played for Union Rennes Basket 35 from 2017 to 2020. He signed with Leotar in 2020 and averaged 10.2 points, 4.5 rebounds, 1.6 assists and 1.0 steal per game. Djurasović re-signed with the team on September 5, 2021.

References

External links
 Eurobasket profile
 Realgm profile
 BGBasket profile
 BIBL Profile

1983 births
Living people
Bosnia and Herzegovina men's basketball players
OKK Spars players
OKK Borac players
KK Leotar players
Serbian expatriate basketball people in Bosnia and Herzegovina
Serbian expatriate basketball people in Cyprus
Serbian expatriate basketball people in France
Serbian expatriate basketball people in Romania
Serbian expatriate basketball people in North Macedonia
Serbian men's basketball players
Basketball players from Dubrovnik
Serbian people of Croatian descent
Small forwards